Colton Schmidt (born October 27, 1990) is an American football punter who is a free agent. He entered the National Football League (NFL) in 2013 when he signed with the San Francisco 49ers as an undrafted free agent in 2013. He played for the Buffalo Bills in four seasons.

Professional career

San Francisco 49ers
Schmidt signed with the San Francisco 49ers as an undrafted free agent, following the 2013 NFL Draft, on July 15, 2013. He was waived on August 2, but re-signed with the team on a three-year contract four days later. He was cut by the team after the third preseason game of 2013.

Cleveland Browns
Schmidt was claimed off waivers by the Cleveland Browns. He did not make the roster and was waived by the team during final roster cuts.

Second stint with the 49ers
Schmidt was signed by the 49ers for the second time on January 7, 2014. He was released by the team on August 26, 2014.

Buffalo Bills
On August 30, 2014, Schmidt was signed by the Buffalo Bills. Schmidt was signed to handle punting duties, while Jordan Gay was signed as a kickoff specialist.

On January 4, 2016, the Bills signed Schmidt to a contract extension.

After initially not being tendered an offer as a restricted free agent after the 2016 season, on March 8, 2017, Schmidt re-signed with the Bills.

On September 2, 2018, Schmidt was released by the Bills after the team claimed Corey Bojorquez off waivers. He was re-signed by the Bills on October 31 after Bojorquez was placed on injured reserve. On November 27, 2018, the Bills released Schmidt again to sign Matt Darr.

Birmingham Iron
Schmidt signed with the Birmingham Iron of the Alliance of American Football on January 9, 2019.  After a week 3 game against the Atlanta Legends where he averaged 49.2 gross yards on 5 punts, Schmidt was named the AAF special teams player of the week. The league ceased operations in April 2019.

Los Angeles Wildcats
In October 2019, Schmidt was selected by the Los Angeles Wildcats in the 2020 XFL Draft's open phase. He was placed on injured reserve before the start of the regular season on February 6, 2020. He had his contract terminated when the league suspended operations on April 10, 2020.

References

External links

1990 births
Living people
Players of American football from Bakersfield, California
American football punters
UC Davis Aggies football players
San Francisco 49ers players
Cleveland Browns players
Buffalo Bills players
Birmingham Iron players
Los Angeles Wildcats (XFL) players